Ibrahim "Ibra" Agbo Lache (1 February 1987 – 1 July 2017) was an amateur football player and coach. He operated as a defender.

He was from Douala in Cameroon and was eligible to play for the Cameroon national football team but chose to play for Equatorial Guinea after a nationality transfer. He has won three caps for Equatorial Guinea, all coming in 2011. He started two of those games and came on as a substitute in the other. Agbo wore the number 4 shirt for Deportivo Mongomo.

Club career
Agbo captained Akonangui FC at the 2006 CAF Confederation Cup.

Agbo has been playing for Deportivo Mongomo since 2010. During this time, the club have won the Equatoguinean Premier League once, in 2010. This title win qualified the club for the 2011 CAF Champions League, and Agbo played in both legs of their 2–1 aggregate defeat to ASPAC FC of Benin in the competition's preliminary round.

Coaching
Even though he still did not possess the proper license, Agbo began working as a manager in 2015, being appointed at Leones Vegetarianos in the Equatoguinean Football League. He was their head coach in the 2015 CAF Confederation Cup preliminary round matches against Nigerian club Dolphins.

International career

The defender made his debut for Equatorial Guinea on 8 February 2011, playing the whole of a 2–0 friendly win over Chad. He won his second international cap in another friendly, a 1–0 victory against Gambia on 29 March 2011.

References

External links

1987 births
2017 deaths
Footballers from Douala
Equatoguinean footballers
Equatorial Guinea international footballers
Cameroonian footballers
Equatoguinean football managers
Cameroonian emigrants to Equatorial Guinea
Association football defenders
CD Elá Nguema players
Akonangui FC players
Deportivo Mongomo players